Europe-Action was a far-right white nationalist and euro-nationalist magazine and movement, founded by Dominique Venner in 1963 and active until 1966. Distancing itself from pre-WWII fascist ideas such as anti-intellectualism, anti-parliamentarianism and traditional French nationalism, Europe-Action promoted a pan-European nationalism based on the "Occident"—or the "white peoples"— and a social Darwinism escorted by racialism, labeled "biological realism". These theories, along with the meta-political strategy of Venner, influenced young Europe-Action journalist Alain de Benoist and are deemed conducive to the creation of GRECE and the Nouvelle Droite in 1968.

History

Background: 1958–1962 
In his 1962 manifesto titled Pour une critique positive ("For a positive critique") that he wrote while in prison, former Jeune Nation member Dominique Venner abandoned the myth of the coup de force, convinced that a political revolution would not be able to happen before a cultural one. The latter could be achieved via the public promotion of nationalist ideas until they achieve popular support. For Venner, intellectual persuasion and violence both had their place; but his movement had to favor ideas over action. He also aimed at removing "old ideas" from pre-WWII nationalism and fascism, such as anti-parliamentarianism, anti-intellectualism, or a form of patriotism reduced to the boundaries of the nation-state. The text was deemed influential in nationalist circles, François Duprat describing For a positive critique as their equivalent of What is to be Done?, a political pamphlet written by Lenin 16 years before the Bolshevik Revolution. They held an ambiguous view of Nazism, Europe-Action stating via Maurice Bardèche that "next to genial intuitions, Hitler made mistakes", which "are largely due to a lack of established doctrinal foundations".

They were also influenced by the "Manifesto of the Class of '60", published three years before the founding of Europe-Action, in which the pro-colonial founders of the Federation of Nationalist Students (FEN) committed themselves to "action of profound consequence", as opposed to the "sterile activism" of street violence alone previously promoted by Jeune Nation in the 1950s. While still deeply committed to the cause of French Algeria, the members of Europe-Action chose to take into account the new world emerging from decolonization and the consolidation of the French Fifth Republic. They consequently tried to theorize a radical right ideology based on materials other than Vichy nostalgia and Catholic traditionalism.

Political activism: 1963–1966 
Europe-Action was launched in January 1963 by Dominique Venner as a nationalist movement escorted by a magazine of the same name, in which Alain de Benoist and François d'Orcival soon became journalists. Jacques Ploncard d'Assac initially wrote for the magazine but soon denounced his anti-Christian stance and left in August 1963. The editing company of the magazine, Société de Presse et d'Édition Saint-Just, was founded in November 1962 by Venner, Suzanne Gingembre, the spouse of former OAS treasurer Maurice Gingembre, and Jacques de Larocque-Latour, a racist caricaturist. Pierre Bousquet, a former Waffen-SS, later joined the company.

In 1964, De Benoist became the editor-in-chief of the weekly publication Europe-Action hebdomadaire. Along with the Federation of Nationalist Students, Europe-Action supported the far-right candidacy of Jean-Louis Tixier-Vignancour in the 1965 presidential election through the "T.V. Committees". After a dispute between the leader of Occident, Pierre Sidos, and the campaign director Jean-Marie Le Pen, Europe-Action volunteers replaced Occident as a support group in the Comité Jeunes ("Youth Committee") of Tixier-Vignancour. Venner's movement used its militant base to organize demonstrations against Algerian immigration.

From June 1965 to 1966, Jean Mabire was redactor-in-chief of Europe-Action. After the electoral demise of Tixier-Vignancour, head members of Europe-Action founded in 1966 the European Rally for Liberty (REL), along with by young nationalists from the Federation of Nationalist Students. Europe-Action hebdomadaire became the organ for the European Rally for Liberty during the campaign, and was replaced by a short-lived magazine named L'Observateur Européen. The REL was only able to run 27 candidates during the 1967 legislative election and failed at 2.58% of the votes. This electoral debacle is cited as conducive to the foundation of the ethno-nationalist think tank GRECE and the development of Nouvelle Droite meta-politics.

The magazine released its last issue in November 1966 following the bankruptcy of its publishing house. Europe-Action ended definitively in the summer 1967 after a failed attempt to relaunch the publication. It had an estimated circulation of 7,500 to 10,000. The symbol of Europe-Action was a hoplite helmet.

Views 
The movement developed two main thesis: a "biological realism" composed of racialism and social Darwinism; and a pan-European nationalism built on a common Western civilization seen as the link between the peoples of the "white race". These ideas were to be promoted through a meta-political strategy of ideological influence until the eventual achievement of cultural dominance in wider society.

Biological realism 
"Biological realism", a concept coined by French neo-fascist activist René Binet in 1950, promoted the establishment of individual and racial inequalities upon pseudo-scientific observations. Binet argued that "interbreeding capitalism" ("capitalisme métisseur") aimed at creating a "uniform inhumanity" ("barbarie uniforme"); and that only "a true socialism" could "achieve race liberation" through the "absolute segregation at both global and national level." Europe-Action also drew influence from the so-called "message of Uppsala", a text likely wrote in 1958 by French neo-fascists related to the New European Order, and deemed influential on European far-right movements that followed as it carried out subtle semantic shifts between "differentialism" and "inequality". The ideas of Binet and "Uppsala", characterized by a worldwide "biological-cultural deal" where each group would remain sovereign in its own region, foreshadowed both the racialism of Europe-Action and the ethno-pluralism of GRECE.

Following the Algerian independence in 1962, Europe-Action was among the first to oppose Algerian immigration (labeled "invasion"). The group defended a racial rather than geographical nationalism, proclaiming race to be "the new homeland, the homeland of the flesh which should be defended with an animal-like ferocity." Opposed to ethnic mix, they called for remigration, arguing that "race mixing [was] nothing more than a slow genocide". Calling for an end to development aid towards former colonies, they feared a future France "occupied by twenty million Maghrebi Arabs and twenty million Negro-Africans".

Europe-Action promoted the project of creating a genetically improved social elite along with, "without futile sentimentality", the elimination of "biological waste", "not through massacres but through eugenic processes". They proposed to "eliminate biological foam" by "returning the mediocre elements of this class to their ranks and retain the valid elite" only, in order "not to allow the biological growth of waste".

Euro-nationalism 
Their conception of Europe was not limited to the continent, and described as a "heart whose blood beats in Johannesburg and in Quebec City, in Sydney and Budapest, aboard white caravels and spaceships, on every sea and in every desert in the world." Europe-Action issue of June 1964 indeed grouped the US, France and South Africa together, as mere "provinces of this large motherland that is the white race."

The "Dictionary of the militant", published in Europe-Action in May 1963, defined the Occident as the "community of the white peoples", the people itself being defined as a "biological unity confirmed by history". The following definition of nationalism is thus given: "doctrine that expresses in political terms the philosophy and the vital necessities of the white people". According to political scientist Stéphane François, this world view was influenced by the Völkisch idea of an organic entity gathering those of the same blood, the same culture and same destiny.

Rejecting both the Europe of the nation-states advocated by the Gaullists and the United States of Europe endorsed by the Christian democrats, Europe-Action supported a racialist Europe that would have been founded on its indigenous ethnic groups, uniting the white peoples of Europe within a powerful imperial entity eventually crowned by an international alliance with white-minority-ruled states like Rhodesia or South Africa.

Meta-politics 
Initially conceived as a think tank founded on a magazine, Europe-Action gradually evolved towards a political movement. Seeking to oppose the anti-intellectualism that had been a major hindrance to the right in the battle of ideas—notably against the Marxist set of concepts—Venner aimed at establishing a new radical right doctrine to be spread in wider society and bring about a nationalist cultural revolution. He progressively accepted the democratic institutions and the emergence of a post-fascist society, arguing that Europe-Action had to show the bureaucracy they were capable of running a state to win their support. Describing Europe-Action members as "militants of a white nation", Venner concluded that nationalists should infiltrate organizations, "however small, including unions, local newspapers, even youth hostels" in order to disseminate their ideas.

Legacy 
Political scientist Stéphane François describes Europe-Action as "the main structure in France that bridged WWII activists and the young post-war generations". Jean-Yves Camus further adds that the "transition from French nationalism to the promotion of European identity, theorized by Europe-Action in the mid-1960s, disrupted the references of the French far-right by producing a gap that has not been repaired to date, separating integral sovereignists, for whom no level of sovereignty is legitimate except the Nation-State [...] from the identitarians, for whom the Nation-State is an intermediate framework between being rooted in a region (in the sense of the German "Heimat") and belonging to the civilized framework of Europe."

Europe-action theories indeed formed the ideological foundations of the think tank GRECE in 1968, and the magazine-movement has been described as the "embryonic form" of the Nouvelle Droite. The latter however distanced themselves from Europe-Action's anti-communism and pro-colonial stance, in order to develop a critic a liberal capitalism and adopt a Third-Worldist point of view. Many founding members of the ethno-nationalist think tank were indeed formerly involved in the magazine. GRECE and the Nouvelle Droite inherited a number of themes from Europe-Action, among them "the anti-Christian stance, a marked elitism, the racial notion of a united Europe, the seeds of a change from biological to cultural definitions of "difference", and the sophisticated inversion of terms like racism and anti-racism". Another group led by Pierre Bousquet, Jean Castrillo, and Pierre Pauty established the magazine Militant in 1967. They were later among the founders of the Front National in 1972, and at the origin of the French Nationalist Party in 1983.

Notable members 

Dominique Venner — founder of Europe-Action
Alain de Benoist — leader of the Nouvelle Droite
Jean Mabire — founding member of the Mouvement Normand and Terre et Peuple
François d'Orcival — member of the editorial committee at Valeurs Actuelles
François Duprat — founding member of the Front National
Maurice Rollet — founding member of the scouting association Europe-Jeunesse
Pierre Bousquet — founding member of the Front National
Alain Lefebvre
Jean-Claude Rivière

See also 

Jeune Nation
Federation of Nationalist Students and the European Rally for Liberty
GRECE

References

Citations

Bibliography

 
 
 
 
 
 
 
 
 
 
 

 
 
 

Neo-fascist organizations
Far-right politics in France
Far-right politics in Europe
Pan-European nationalism
New Right (Europe)
Monthly magazines published in France
Magazines established in 1963
Magazines disestablished in 1966
Defunct political magazines published in France